Sir John Arnold Farr (25 September 1922 – 25 October 1997) was a Conservative Party politician in the United Kingdom.

Born in Nottingham, Farr was educated at Harrow School and served with the Royal Navy during World War II. He became a farmer, Lloyd's member and director of a brewery company.

Farr contested Ilkeston in 1955. He was Member of Parliament (MP) for Harborough from 1959 until his retirement at the 1992 general election. In 1967 Farr referred to homosexuality as a "wrongful practice" and a "disease" and called on parliament to enact a provision to prevent its "spread" in prisons.

In 1974, a large amount of Farr's territory was hived off to create the new constituency of Blaby, which was won by future Chancellor of the Exchequer Nigel Lawson.

In 1960, he married Susan Milburn, daughter of Sir Leonard Milburn: the couple had two sons. Lady Farr died in 2011.

References

 The Independent – obituary
The Times Guide to the House of Commons, Times Newspapers Ltd, 1955, 1966 & 1987

External links 
 

1922 births
1997 deaths
Royal Navy officers
Conservative Party (UK) MPs for English constituencies
People educated at Harrow School
UK MPs 1959–1964
UK MPs 1964–1966
UK MPs 1966–1970
UK MPs 1970–1974
UK MPs 1974
UK MPs 1974–1979
UK MPs 1979–1983
UK MPs 1983–1987
UK MPs 1987–1992
Royal Naval Volunteer Reserve personnel of World War II
Knights Bachelor
Politicians awarded knighthoods